Chaco is a genus of spider in the family Nemesiidae.

Species
, the World Spider Catalog accepted the following species:

Chaco ansilta Ferretti, 2014 – Argentina
Chaco castanea Montes de Oca & Pérez-Miles, 2013 – Uruguay
Chaco costai Montes de Oca & Pérez-Miles, 2013 – Uruguay
Chaco melloleitaoi (Bücherl, Timotheo & Lucas, 1971) – Brazil
Chaco obscura Tullgren, 1905 (type species) – Argentina
Chaco patagonica Goloboff, 1995 – Argentina
Chaco sanjuanina Goloboff, 1995 – Argentina
Chaco socos Goloboff, 1995 – Chile
Chaco tecka Goloboff, 1995 – Argentina
Chaco tigre Goloboff, 1995 – Chile
Chaco tingua Indicatti et al., 2015 – Brazil
Chaco tucumana Goloboff, 1995 – Argentina

References

Nemesiidae
Mygalomorphae genera
Spiders of South America